Gaydon is a chanson de geste written in about 1230 AD. It recounts the story of Thierry, friend of Charlemagne in the Chanson de Roland, for whom "Gaydon" is another name.

References

Further reading 

 Wilhelm Reimann (1881). Die Chanson de Gaydon, ihre Quellen und die angevinische Thierry-Gaydon-Sage (in German). In: H. Perschmann, W. Reimann, A. Rhode (1881). Beiträge zur Kritik der französischen Karlsepen, volume III of Ausgaben und Abhandlungen aus dem Gebiete der romanischen Philologie. Marburg: N. G. Elwert'sche Verlagsbuchhandlung, pages 49–121.
 William Calin (1966). The Epic Quest: Studies in Four Old French Chansons de Geste. Baltimore, Maryland: The Johns Hopkins Press.
 Jean Subrenat (1974). Etude sur "Gaydon", chanson de geste du XIIIe siècle (in French). Aix-en-Provence: Editions de l'Université de Provence; Paris: Ophrys.

13th-century poems
Chansons de geste
French poems